Seema Singh (born 11 June 1990) is an Indian actress, dancer, model, and television presenter. Singh is one of the most famous item song dancers in Bhojpuri cinema 
and has been nicknamed 'Item Queen'
for appearing in over 500 films and videos.
 Singh has established a career in Bhojpuri film, and is the recipient of several awards,
including Bhojpuri Film Awards.

References

Seema Singh is a dancer, actress, model and producer, Seema started her career with modeling, she says that her feet are visible only in the cradle, Seema was also fond of dance and acting since childhood, Seema's father gave her Wanted to get a government job but Seema decided to make a career in acting . Seema Singh's first film is Bhojpuri film "Kaha Jaiba Raja Nazriya ladai Ke" which was released in 2008, she has also received the Best Item Girl Award in 2008 itself, she was also named Dance Queen in 2008 for Bhojpuri films. She has also been awarded the Nari Shakti Award in the year 2017 at the Kajari Festival held in Mumbai. Seema Singh is recognized as an item girl in Bhojpuri cinema world, in addition to Bhojpuri films, in Marathi, Telugu, Gujarati, Rajasthani, Hindi and Bengali films.

Seema singh biography in hindi BNTV 29 January 2022

भोजपुरी फिल्मों की डांस क्वीन, जिन्हें देखकर हेलेन की याद ताजा हो जाएग, 26 June 2016, Dainik Jagranये हैं भोजपुरी फिल्मों की आइटम क्वीन, सलमान की मां को मानती है रोल मॉडल, 14 July 2016, Dainik Bhaskarये हैं भोजपुरी फ‍िल्मों की आइटम क्वीन, फिर आ रही हैं होश उड़ाने, 23 April 2018, Aaj Tak''

1990 births
Living people
Actresses from Mumbai
Indian female dancers
Female models from Mumbai
Indian women television presenters
Indian television presenters
Dancers from Maharashtra